Addiction is a state that is characterized by compulsive drug use or compulsive engagement in rewarding behavior, despite negative consequences.

Addiction may also refer to:

 Addiction (journal), a scientific journal
 "Addiction" (CSI: Miami), an episode of the TV series CSI: Miami
 The Addiction, a 1995 vampire film by Abel Ferrara
 Addiction (film), a 2004 Finnish romantic drama film
 The Addiction (professional wrestling), a professional wrestling tag team
 Jojo Addiction, a Czech paraglider design

Music 
 Addiction (Chico DeBarge album), 2009
 Addiction (Glenn Hughes album), 1996
 Addictions: Volume 1, a 1989 album by Robert Palmer
 Addictions: Volume II, a 1992 album by Robert Palmer
 "Addiction" (Medina song), 2011
 "Addiction" (Skinny Puppy song), 1987 
 "Addiction" (Ryan Leslie song), 2008
 "Addiction", a song by Kanye West from his 2005 album Late Registration
 "Addiction", a song by Doja Cat from her 2019 album Hot Pink
 "Addiction", a song by Simon Townshend, from his 1985 album Moving Target
 "Addiction", a song by The Almighty, from their 1993 album Powertrippin'
 The Addiction (album), a 2006 album by rapper Fiend

See also
 Addicted (disambiguation)
 Addictive (disambiguation)
 The Adicts, a British punk band
 "Addict" (soundtrack), a soundtrack album from the anime series FLCL
 "Addicts" (Undeclared episode), a 2001 episode of American sitcom Undeclared